Stephen Kelman (born 1976) is an English novelist, who grew up on Marsh Farm council estate in Luton. He studied marketing at the University of Bedfordshire, then worked variously as a warehouse operative, as a caseworker, and in marketing and local government administration.

Writings
Kelman took up writing seriously in 2005, as he had wanted to do from a young age. He has completed several feature screenplays since.

Pigeon English, Kelman's debut novel, was inspired by the murder of Damilola Taylor and shortlisted for the 2011 Man Booker Prize, and the Desmond Elliot Prize, gaining him the title 2011 writer of the year and the Guardian first book award. He now lives with his wife Uzma in St Albans. Meanwhile, he has taught underprivileged children martial arts in his home town.

His latest work, Man on Fire, is a fictional biography of an actual Indian journalist, Bibhuti Bhushan Nayak, with multiple Guinness and Limca Book of Records. The work considers human dignity and male folly, transformation, loss and rebirth. It was released by Bloomsbury Publishing house in 2015 and appeared in 28 countries.

References

External links
Stephen's page, Conville and Walsh literary agency

1976 births
21st-century English novelists
People from Luton
Living people
Alumni of the University of Bedfordshire
English male novelists
21st-century English male writers